Królówka is a sołectwo in the south of Orzesze, Silesian Voivodeship, southern Poland. It was an independent village but was, as a part of gmina Gardawice, administratively merged into Orzesze in 1975. It has an area of 5.6 km² and about 260 inhabitants.

History 
The village was established in the 13th or 14th century. Historically it was tied with Woszczyce (common noble owners, Catholic parish, municipality, elementary school).

After World War I in the Upper Silesia plebiscite 151 out of 155 voters in Królówka voted in favour of joining Poland, against 4 opting for staying in Germany.

References

Neighbourhoods in Silesian Voivodeship
Mikołów County